This is a timeline of the 2006 Lebanon War during early August.

August 1

August 2

August 3

August 4

August 5

August 6

August 7

August 8

August 9

References

2006 Lebanon War
2006 Lebanon War (early August)